Szabolcs Gyánó (born 9 January 1980 in Dombóvár) is a Hungarian international footballer. He currently plays for Pécsi Mecsek FC in the Hungarian League.

On 7 August 2006 he moved to Académica de Coimbra. After two years he returned to his home country, and signed to Vasas.

References
European Football Clubs & Squads
HLSZ.hu profile 
Profile on pmfc.hu 

1980 births
Living people
People from Dombóvár
Hungarian footballers
Association football forwards
Szekszárdi UFC footballers
Kecskeméti TE players
Vasas SC players
Zalaegerszegi TE players
Associação Académica de Coimbra – O.A.F. players
S.C. Beira-Mar players
Pécsi MFC players
Kozármisleny SE footballers
Hungarian expatriate footballers
Expatriate footballers in Portugal
Hungarian expatriate sportspeople in Portugal
Sportspeople from Tolna County